Bénéwendé Stanislas Sankara (born February 23, 1959) is a Burkinabé politician and the President of the Union for Rebirth/Sankarist Movement (UNIR/MS) party.

Life and career
Sankara was born in Toéssin. He founded the UNIR/MS in November 2000 and was one of three UNIR/MS candidates elected to the National Assembly in the 2002 parliamentary election. In the National Assembly, he was elected to the Pan-African Parliament. In June 2005 he resigned from both the National Assembly and the Pan-African Parliament to focus on his candidacy in the presidential election later in the year. Running as the UNIR/MS candidate in the election, held on 13 November 2005, Sankara placed second out of 13 candidates, receiving 4.88% of the vote; President Blaise Compaoré won the election with an overwhelming majority.

In the May 2007 parliamentary election, Sankara was elected to the National Assembly. He was one of four UNIR/MS candidates to be elected, and the only one elected on the party's national list.

Reacting to moves to change the constitution to remove presidential term limits, Sankara said in late July 2009 that it was unacceptable to change the constitution so that President Compaoré could "spend his whole life in power".

He was a candidate in the November 2010 presidential election, and stood again, after Compaoré was ousted, in the November 2015 presidential election (4th place? 2,77% of votes). He was also elected to the National Assembly in the concurrent parliamentary election as a candidate on the UNIR/PS national list, and on 12 January 2016 he was elected as First Vice-President of the National Assembly.

See also
 List of members of the Pan-African Parliament

References

1959 births
Living people
Presidents of the National Assembly of Burkina Faso
Members of the National Assembly of Burkina Faso
Members of the Pan-African Parliament from Burkina Faso
Sankarists
Union for Rebirth / Sankarist Party politicians
21st-century Burkinabé people